The Țibleș is a tributary of the river Brad in Romania. It flows into the Brad 9 km east of Groșii Țibleșului. Its source is on Mount Țibleș, close to the source of another, larger river also named Țibleș, that flows south to the Someșul Mare.

References

Rivers of Romania
Rivers of Maramureș County